Nicolas La Vigna (born 17 June 1997) is an Italian football player who plays for Torres.

Club career

Atalanta 
Born in Milan, La Vigna was a youth exponent of Atalanta.

Loan to Piacenza 
On 11 July 2016, La Vigna was signed by Serie C side Piacenza on a season-long loan deal. On 4 December he made his professional debut in Serie C for Piacenza as a substitute replacing Andrea Razzitti in the 74th minute of a 4–1 home defeat against Racing Roma. On 26 March 2017, La Vigna played his first match as a starter for Piacenza, a 2–1 away win over Como, he was replaced by Alessandro Cazzamalli in the 72nd minute. La Vigna also helped the club to reach the play-offs, however Piacenza loss 2–0 against Parma, he played the last 5 minute as a substitute. He ended his season-long loan to Piacenza with only 8 appearances, including 4 of them as a starter, 1 assist, however he didn't play any entire match during the season.

Loan to Pro Piacenza 
On 10 July 2017, La Vigna and Janis Cavagna were loaned by Serie C club Pro Piacenza on a season-long loan deal. On 30 July, he made his debut for Pro Piacenza in a 4–1 away defeat against Vicenza in the first round of Coppa Italia, he played the entire match. On 27 August, La Vigna made his Serie C debut for the club and he scored his first professional goal in the 50th minute of a 3–1 home win over Giana Erminio, he played the entire match. On 18 February 2018 he scored his second goal, as a substitute, in the 82nd minute of a 3–1 home win over Viterbese Castrense. On 28 April he scored his third goal for Pro Piacenza in the 29th minute of a 4-1 home win over Arzachena. La Vigna ended his season-long loan to Pro Piacenza with 35 appearances, 3 goals and 2 assists.

Loan to Pontedera 
On 18 July 2018, La Vigna was loaned to Serie C side Pontedera on a season-long loan deal. Eleven days later, on 29 July, he made his debut and he also scored his first goal for the club in the 13th minute of a 1–1 away draw against Ternana, however Pontedera loss 4–2 defeat at penalties, in the first round of Coppa Italia, he was replaced by Michele Bruzzo in the 98th minute. On 22 September, La Vigna made his debut for Pontedera, in Serie C, in a 2–0 away defeat against Piacenza, he was replaced by Riccardo Benedetti after 79 minutes. Four days later, on 26 September, he played his first entire match for Pontedera, a 2–1 home win over Albissola. La Vigna ended his loan to Pontedera with 33 appearances, including 24 of them as a starter and scoring 1 goal.

Picerno 
On 1 October 2019, La Vigna signed for newly promoted Serie C club Picerno on a free-transfer. Five days later, on 6 October, he made his debut for the club as a substitute replacing Umberto Nappello in the 67th minute of a 2–2 away draw against Bisceglie. On 31 January 2020, his contract with Picerno was terminated by mutual consent.

Torres
On 22 December 2020, La Vigna joined Serie D club Torres.

Career statistics

Club

References

External links
 

1997 births
Footballers from Milan
Living people
Italian footballers
Piacenza Calcio 1919 players
U.S. Città di Pontedera players
Serie C players
Serie D players
Association football midfielders